Derwent is an electoral ward in the city of Derby, England.  The ward contains four listed buildings that are recorded in the National Heritage List for England.  All the listed buildings are designated at Grade II, the lowest of the three grades, which is applied to "buildings of national importance and special interest". The ward is to the northeast of the centre of the city, and the listed buildings consist of a bridge, buildings at the entrance to Nottingham Road Cemetery, a war memorial in thea cemetery, and an office block.
  

Buildings

References

Citations

Sources

 

Lists of listed buildings in Derbyshire
Listed buildings in Derby